The Afghanistan national cricket team played the Australian national cricket team in a single One Day International (ODI) in the United Arab Emirates during Australia's concurrent series against Pakistan in UAE in August 2012. The match took place on 25 August, and was held at the Sharjah Cricket Stadium. The match was notable for being the first time a One Day International would be played over two days and with both innings starting at night. The match started at 18:00 GST and was scheduled to finish at around 1:45 during the morning of the 26th. It was also Afghanistan's second ODI against a full member of the International Cricket Council, following their one off ODI earlier in the year against Pakistan, and their first meeting in any format against Australia. Australia won this first meeting between the sides by 66 runs.

Squads

ODI series

Only ODI

References

2012 in cricket
International cricket competitions in 2012